Fiebre de amor (English: Love Fever) may refer to:

 Fiebre de amor (film), a 1985 Mexican film
 Fiebre de amor (soundtrack), the soundtrack album for the Mexican film